Across the Plains is a 1928 American silent Western film directed by Robert J. Horner and starring Ted Wells.  It is a silent Western.

Plot
A dance-hall girl in a wide-open cowtown falls in love with the tough foreman of a cattle ranch. They plan to marry, but they run into more problems than they counted on.

Cast
 Ted Wells as Jim Blake
 Ione Reed as Helen Williams 
 Jack Richardson as Joe Steward 
 Martha Barclay as Sally Howard 
 William Barrymore as Walla-walla Slim 
 Cliff Lyons as Chuck Lang

References

External links 
 

1928 films
1928 Western (genre) films
American black-and-white films
Silent American Western (genre) films
1920s American films
1920s English-language films